Haemerosia is a genus of moths of the family Noctuidae. The genus was erected by Jean Baptiste Boisduval in 1840.

Species
Haemerosia ionochlora Ronkay, Varga & Hreblay, 1998 Turkmenistan
Subgenus Haemerosia
Haemerosia renalis (Hübner, [1813]) south-eastern Europe, Near East, Turkey, Iraq, western Iran
Haemerosia albicomma Ronkay, Varga & Hreblay, 1998 Turkmenistan (Kopet Dagh)
Haemerosia vassilininei A. Bang-Haas, 1912 Greece, Bulgaria, Caucasus, Iran
Subgenus Gyrohypsoma
Haemerosia sterrha (Staudinger, 1888)

References

Hadeninae